Velikiye Luki (lit. great meanders or longbows) is a town in Pskov Oblast, Russia, located on the meandering Lovat River. It is the second largest town in Pskov Oblast; population:   Velikiye Luki is a City of Military Glory, an honor bestowed on it because of the courage and heroism its citizens displayed during World War II.

History

Velikiye Luki is first mentioned in a chronicle under the year of 1166 as Luki. From the 12th century, Luki was a part of the Novgorod Republic. After the construction of a fortress in 1211, Luki gained strategic importance, defending the approaches to Pskov and Novgorod. It was located near the border with Lithuania. The adjective Velikiye in the name first appeared in the early 15th century. It was incorporated into the Grand Duchy of Moscow by Ivan the Great in 1478. During the Livonian War, it played an important role. It was besieged and captured by Polish King Stephen Báthory in 1580, and remained under Polish control until 1582.

In the course of the administrative reform carried out in 1708 by Peter the Great, Velikiye Luki was included into Ingermanland Governorate (known since 1710 as Saint Petersburg Governorate). It was explicitly mentioned as one of the towns the governorate comprised. In 1727, separate Novgorod Governorate was split off, and in 1772, Pskov Governorate (which between 1777 and 1796 existed as Pskov Viceroyalty) was established. After 1777, Velikiye Luki was the seat of Velikolutsky Uyezd (later known as Velikoluksky Uyezd). At the beginning of the 20th century, it evolved into an important railway hub following the construction of the railway connecting Moscow with Riga.

On 1 August 1927, the uyezds were abolished, and Velikoluksky District was established, with the administrative center in Velikiye Luki. Pskov Governorate was abolished as well, Velikiye Luki was the center of Velikiye Luki Okrug of Leningrad Oblast. On 17 June 1929 the okrug was transferred to Western Oblast. On 23 July 1930 the okrugs were also abolished. On 29 January 1935 Western Oblast was abolished, and the district was transferred to Kalinin Oblast, and on 5 February that year Velikiye Luki became the center of Velikiye Luki Okrug of Kalinin Oblast, one of the okrugs abutting the state boundaries of the Soviet Union. On 4 May 1938 the okrug was abolished again.

From 19 to 21 July 1941 and again from 25 August 1941 to 17 January 1943, Velikiye Luki was occupied by German troops. During World War II, in 1941 and 1942, fighting took place in the vicinity between German and Soviet forces. In 1942, the Germans established a forced labour camp in the city. During the Battle for Velikiye Luki (in late 1942), a German force of about 20,000 was surrounded in the town which had been turned into a fortress. After months of heavy fighting, the German defenders were finally defeated and Velikiye Luki was liberated by the troops of the 3rd Shock Army of the Kalinin Front of the Red Army on 17 January 1943.  
The town was almost completely destroyed. 

A significant portion of the Soviet forces fighting on Velikiye Luki consisted of Estonians mobilized to the Red Army, and approximately 6000 of them died liberating the town. The railroad system in Velikiye Luki was the target of a mass air raid on 19 July 1944 by Heinkel He 177 heavy bomber aircraft, the only documented mass raid utilizing this model of aircraft. Many streets are named after the heroes of the War. One such street is named after Yelizaveta Chaikina. 

On 22 August 1944 Velikiye Luki Oblast was established, with the administrative center in Velikiye Luki. On 2 October 1957 Velikiye Luki Oblast was abolished, and Velikiye Luki was transferred to Pskov Oblast as the town of oblast significance.

850th celebration

In 2016, Velikiye Luki celebrated the 850th anniversary of the town's first appearance on historical sources, which is dated to 1166. 

The town marked the event with festivals and historical exhibitions, as well as making long-term improvements. In 2013, town planners began the preparations to improve the infrastructure and quality of life for residents. Russian Prime Minister Dmitry Medvedev offered federal support to the anniversary, and recommended the Ministry of Transport fund a much-needed overpass connecting the two busiest parts of Velikiye Luki. The majority (70%) of the buildings in the town, including the schools, were built in the 1950s and 1960s and needed modernisation. New sports and leisure facilities were needed. Town officials stated the overall aim is to preserve the historical aspects of the city.

Among the improvements planned was the remodel of a large obelisk in Jubilee Square, which was erected on the city's 800th anniversary in 1966 but never finished (and had been dubbed a "white elephant"). A contest was held to solicit designs for the remodel of the obelisk, as well as logos and slogans for the festivities. The winning design for the obelisk features elements symbolising the town's history, including Viking and Greek features.

Administrative and municipal status
Within the framework of administrative divisions, it serves as the administrative center of Velikoluksky District, even though it is not a part of it. As an administrative division, it is incorporated separately as the Town of Velikiye Luki—an administrative unit with the status equal to that of the districts. As a municipal division, the Town of Velikiye Luki is incorporated as Velikiye Luki Urban Okrug and serves as the administrative center of Velikoluksky Municipal District.

Economy

Industry
Velikiye Luki is an industrial city, with several enterprises in machine building industry. They produce machines for timber industry, electrotechnical equipment, and batteries. There is a workshop to repair railway carriages and locomotives. There are also enterprises of timber, textile, and food industries, as well as production of brickstones. Food industry in 2010 was responsible for production of 24.8% of all industrial output, and electrotechnical industry produced 15% of the output.

Transportation

Velikiye Luki is an important railway hub. One railway connects Moscow via Velikiye Luki with Riga and runs in the east-west direction.  Another railway, running to the northwest, connects Velikiye Luki via Toropets and Ostashkov with Bologoye. One more railway connects Velikiye Luki to Nevel, where it splits into two railway lines, both running southeast into Belarus: One line to Vitebsk, and another one to Grodno via Polotsk and Molodechno.

The M9 highway which connects Moscow and Riga bypasses Velikiye Luki, which has an access to the highway. Other roads connect Velikiye Luki with Novosokolniki, with Nevel, and with Porkhov via Loknya. There are also local roads.

The town is served by the Velikiye Luki Airport.

Culture and recreation

The district contains seven objects classified as cultural and historical heritage of federal significance and thirty-three monuments of local significance. The federal monuments include the Kazan Church built in the 19th century,  and the ramparts, the oldest of which originate from the 12th century.

The two museums in Velikiye Luki are the Velikiye Luki Local Museum, which exhibits collections of local interest, and Ivan Vinogradov Museum-House, located in the house which belonged to the parents of mathematician Ivan Vinogradov. The house was restored in the 1970s with the help of Vinogradov himself. He lived here before moving to study in Saint Petersburg.

Education 
There are several institutions of higher education in the city:
 State Agricultural Academy of Velikie Luki,
 Velikiye Luki State Academy of Physical Education and Sports,
 branch of St. Petersburg State Transport University,
 branch of Pskov State University.

Sports
Velikiye Luki is notable for ballooning competitions, which are held in the town annually since 1996. Since 1999, the competitions have been internationally recognized.

Climate

People
Velikiye Luki has been claimed as the birthplace of Soviet Marshal Konstantin Rokossovsky. The Hero of the Soviet Union Alexander Matrosov is buried in this city. Modest Mussorgsky's memorial house in Kunyinsky District, standing on the bank of a large picturesque lake, is within easy range of the town.

Other people from Velikiye Luki include:
Alexandra Burchenkova (born 1988), road racing cyclist
Roman Kagazezhev (born 1980), professional football player
German Lovchev (born 1981), professional footballer
Andrei Lukanchenkov (born 1986), professional footballer
Oleg Marichev (born 1945), mathematician
Viktor Safronov (1917–1999), astronomer
Genrikh Fedosov (1932–2005), football player
Sergey Firsanov (born 1982), professional road bicycle racer
Allan Erdman (born 1933), retired Soviet shooter
Dmitri Alenichev (born.1972), is a Russian football coach, former player and politician

Twin towns and sister cities

Velikiye Luki is twinned with:
 Maardu, Estonia
 Seinäjoki, Finland

References

Sources 

Griehl, Manfred. Heinkel He 177 'Greif': The only long-range bomber in Luftwaffe service''. Erlangen, Germany: AirDOC 2008. ISBN 978-3-93568-747-8.

External links
vluki850.ru - Official 850th Anniversary site

Cities and towns in Pskov Oblast
Velikoluksky Uyezd
1166 establishments in Europe
12th-century establishments in Russia